Abdul Majeed Khan Achakzai (born 22 December 1962) is a Pakistani politician from Balochistan affiliated with the Pakhtunkhwa Milli Awami Party. Born in 1962 in Gulistan, he is an agriculturist by profession and is a graduate of the University of Balochistan. From 2002 to 2007, he served as a member of the Provincial Assembly of Balochistan. He was elected from the PB-13 constituency (Killa Abdullah).

In the general election of 2013, he was elected into the provincial assembly again from the same constituency. He belongs to the Achakzai family of Balochistan, which includes prominent personalities such as Abdul Samad Achakzai, Muhammad Khan Achakzai, Mahmood Khan Achakzai and Hamid Khan Achakzai.

Hit and run accusation
On 20 June 2017, Inspector Ataullah was controlling traffic at GPO Chowk on Zarghoon Road, Quetta, when he was hit by a speeding Land Cruiser. Initially, the police registered a case against unknown persons for killing the traffic inspector. However, when CCTV footage of the incident was aired on media, Majeed Khan Achakzai was arrested three days later. He was released on bail.

In September 2020, a model court in Pakistan's Balochistan province acquitted Majeed Khan Achakzai.

References

1962 births
Living people
Abdul
Balochistan MPAs 2013–2018
Pashtunkhwa Milli Awami Party politicians
Pashtun people
People from Killa Abdullah District
Politicians from Quetta
University of Balochistan alumni